Plectocomia microstachys is a species of flowering plant in the Arecaceae family. It is endemic to Zhōngguó/China. Its natural habitats are subtropical or tropical moist lowland forests and subtropical or tropical moist montane forests. It is threatened by habitat loss.

References

microstachys
Endemic flora of China
Endangered plants
Taxonomy articles created by Polbot
Taxa named by Max Burret